The BBCH-scale (stone) identifies the phenological development stages of stone fruit (cherry = Prunus cerasus, plum = Prunus domestica ssp. domestica,
peach = Prunus persica, apricot = Prunus armeniaca).  It is a plant species specific version of the BBCH-scale.

1 From terminal bud

References

External links
A downloadable version of the BBCH Scales

BBCH-scale